Harpalus meridianus is a species of ground beetle in the subfamily Harpalinae. It was described by Andrewes in 1923.

References

meridianus
Beetles described in 1923